Kinesin-like protein KIF13A is a protein that in humans is encoded by the KIF13A gene.

Interactions
KIF13A has been shown to interact with AP1B1.

References

Further reading